Star in the Hood is the debut studio album by British-Ghanaian rapper Tinchy Stryder. It was released on 13 August 2007 on Takeover Entertainment

Critical reception
Maxine Headley of BBC Music claimed: "In the same way that hip hop's current state of health has been recently questioned, the debate of whether or not Grime has a future is generating many heated discussions. Prominent icons are seemingly moving away from the genre - Kano's doing the hip hop thing, Dizzie Rascal's collaborating with the MySpace successes, Lily Allen and Arctic Monkey's, to sustain mainstream interest, and the 'Godfather of Grime', Wiley, is retiring - the need for a new ally to march the movement forward is essential.
Step up Tinchy Styder, who after several mix tapes finally releases his debut album, Star In The Hood, in an attempt to see if grime really does pay. And you know what, it just might. Yes, fans that have known Tinch from the beginning will hear him tone down his fiery musical 'tantrums' on some of the tracks, in order to obtain mass appeal. Looking no further than the DaVinChe produced single 'Something About Your Smile', its catchy hook and upbeat tempo has all the signs of a successful pop song. Really, there isn't anything wrong with that, Tinch hasn't totally deserted those who have made him a 'household name' in fact much of the lyrical content is still grimy, notably on 'Not Like Me' where he declares his originality as an artist, as with the title track 'Star In The Hood' claiming, well, the same thing. However the effort in 'keeping it real' on 'Catch 'Em' doesn't help dispel the current issues of how inner city youths get caught up in unnecessary life threatening altercations. Lucky, the inclusion of female vocals creates diversity on the album; 'Hands Of Time' with its reggae undertones and sentimental message show a softer side to Tinch, while 'Stereotypes' featuring and produced by Goldielocks, commands you not to assume 'we're some wasted kids, who aint got a clue about the music biz'. A Grime album wouldn't be a Grime album without a boisterous MC talking about his takeover of the world. Soldier on a mission, we salute you!"

Singles
 "Breakaway" was released as the album's lead single on 9 April 2007.
 "Something About Your Smile" was released as the album's second single on 6 August 2007.
 "Mainstream Money" was released as a double A-side with "Sorry, You Are?", featuring Chipmunk, on 12 November 2007. The track also features on Stryder's Cloud 9 The EP.

Track listing

Personnel
 Tinchy Stryder – record executive
 David Nkrumah – sound engineer
 DaVinChe – mixing engineer
 Prince Rapid – mastering engineer
 Maniac – mastering engineer

References

External links
Star In The Hood At Rewind Magazine

2007 debut albums
Tinchy Stryder albums
Takeover Entertainment albums
Albums produced by Tinchy Stryder